Sumakuru is a genus of jumping spiders in the subfamily Lyssomaninae. It was first described in 2016 by Wayne Maddison. Both males and females are very small compared with other species in Lyssomaninae. , it contains two species:

 Sumakuru bigal Maddison, 2016 – Ecuador
 Sumakuru felca Galvis, 2017 – Colombia

References

Salticidae
Salticidae genera
Spiders of South America